Albert Worthy (1 November 1905 – 1 February 1978) was an English professional footballer who made 332 appearances in the Football League playing for Chesterfield, Lincoln City, Southend United and Rochdale. He played as a right back.

Life and career
Worthy was born in Pilsley, Derbyshire, and played football for Danesmoor before joining Chesterfield. He played seven league games during the 1926–27 season before moving on to Third Division North rivals Lincoln City. He scored his first Football League goal from a free kick in a 5–0 defeat of Barrow in October 1928. He rarely missed a match in his first five seasons with the club, at the end of which they won the Third Division North title and consequent promotion. Worthy was not a regular first choice in the Second Division, and left the club for Southend United of the Third Division South in the 1933 close season. After one season in which he played 30 games in all competitions, he returned to the Northern Section for three years with Rochdale, after which he played non-league football for Gainsborough Trinity and Shrewsbury Town.

Worthy died in Lower Pilsley, Derbyshire, in 1978 at the age of 72.

References

1905 births
1978 deaths
People from Pilsley, North East Derbyshire
Footballers from Derbyshire
English footballers
Association football fullbacks
Chesterfield F.C. players
Lincoln City F.C. players
Southend United F.C. players
Rochdale A.F.C. players
Gainsborough Trinity F.C. players
Shrewsbury Town F.C. players
English Football League players